Glassy is the debut single album by South Korean singer Jo Yu-ri. It consists of three tracks, including the lead single of the same name. The single album was released by Wake One Entertainment on October 7, 2021.

Background and release
On September 24, Wake One Entertainment announced that Jo Yu-ri would be making her solo debut with single album titled Glassy on October 7. The photo teaser was released on September 27 and September 30. On October 1, the track listing was released with "Glassy" announced as the lead single. On October 3, the highlight medley video was released. On October 4, the music video teaser for lead single "Glassy" was released. On October 6, the second music video teaser for "Glassy" was released. The single album was released on October 7, along with the music video for "Glassy".

Composition
"Glassy" was described as a dance-pop song with "lively and catchy melody" and characterized by Jo Yu-ri's "charming voice". "Express Moon" was described as a medium-tempo song with "impressive warm yet powerful instrumental tune" and "romantic melody". "Autumn Memories" was described as an "emotional duet" ballad song.

Promotion
Following the single album's release, Jo Yu-ri held a live event on the same day called "Jo Yuri The 1st Single album [Glassy] Showcase" on Universe to introduce the single album and communicate with her fans.

Commercial performance
On October 5, Wake One Entertainment announced Glassy had more than 50,000 pre-order sales.The album debuted at number 7 on the Gaon Album Chart and moved to number 5 the following week.

Track listing

Credits and personnel
Credits adapted from Melon.

Studio
 M Creative Sound Studio – recording 
 MonoTree Studio – recording 
 Seoul Studio – recording 
 918 Studio – mixing 
 821 Sound Mastering – mastering 

Personnel

 Jo Yu-ri – vocals, background vocals
 Hwang Yu-bin – lyrics 
 Honest – lyrics 
 Lee Joo-hyeong (MonoTree) – lyrics, composition 
 Choo Dae-gwan (MonoTree) – lyrics, composition, arrangement, vocal directing, bass, keyboard, string arrangement, string conducting 
 Kim Hae-ron (MonoTree) – lyrics, composition, background vocals 
 Kwon Ae-jin (MonoTree) – lyrics, composition, background vocals 
 Park Woo-sang – composition, arrangement, recording, mixing, synth, drums 
 Bottle Paik – composition, arrangement, synth, drums 
 Boran – composition, arrangement, background vocals 
 Inner Child (MonoTree) – composition 
 Minky – arrangement, synth, drums 
 Kyum Lyk – composition, arrangement 
 Hyezoo – composition, background vocals 
 Jang Min – recording 
 Kang Sun-young – recording 
 Jeong Gi-hong – recording 
 Choi Da-in – recording 
 Lee Joo-hyung – digital editing 
 Seo Dong-gwang – mixing 
 Kwon Nam-woo – mastering 
 Park Woo-sang – keyboard, bass 
 Young – guitar 
 Kim Jin-kyu – guitar 
 Jeog Jae – guitar 
 Weedstring – strings

Charts

Release history

References

External links
 

Jo Yu-ri albums
2021 debut albums
Korean-language albums
Stone Music Entertainment albums
Wake One Entertainment single albums